Franck Bonnamour (born 20 June 1995) is a French cyclist, who currently rides for UCI WorldTeam . His father, Yves Bonnamour, was also a professional cyclist. He rode and completed his first grand tour in the 2021 Tour de France, in which he placed 22nd overall was given the overall combativity award, despite not having been awarded any individual stage combativity award.

Major results

2012
 2nd Overall Liège–La Gleize
1st  Young rider classification
1st Stage 1
2013
 1st  Road race, UEC European Junior Road Championships
 5th Overall Giro di Basilicata
2014
 8th Overall Tour de Bretagne
2015
 2nd Road race, National Under-23 Road Championships
 5th Ronde van Vlaanderen Beloften
 8th Grand Prix de Wallonie
2017
 1st  Mountains classification, Tour du Haut Var
 9th Tour du Finistère
 10th Grand Prix de Plumelec-Morbihan
2018
 8th Famenne Ardenne Classic
 8th Tour de Vendée
2019
 2nd Tour du Doubs
 8th Overall Kreiz Breizh Elites
2020
 10th Grand Prix de la Ville de Lillers
2021
 2nd Overall Tour du Limousin
 2nd Paris–Tours
 6th Bretagne Classic
 7th Overall Tour Poitou-Charentes en Nouvelle-Aquitaine
 8th Tour du Jura
 9th Paris–Camembert
 10th Trofeo Serra de Tramuntana
  Combativity award Overall Tour de France
2022
 1st Polynormande
 7th Classic Loire Atlantique

Grand Tour general classification results timeline

References

External links

People from Lannion
1995 births
Living people
French male cyclists
Sportspeople from Côtes-d'Armor
Cyclists from Brittany